Racing Club Pays de Grasse is a French association football club founded in 1959. Until 2022 they were known as Racing Club de Grasse. They are based in the town of Grasse and their home stadium is the Stade Jean Girard. Since the 2017–18 season, they play in the Championnat National 2.

History
RC Grasse was formed in 1950 as a result of the merger of two clubs, Gallia Club Grasse and Red Star Grasse. The club played for more than 30 years in the regional league of the Mediterranean. They were first promoted to the national competitions in 1983, taking a place in 1983–84 Division 4, where they only missed out on a further promotion on the last day of the season.

The club remained at the fourth level of French football for six seasons, being relegated back to the regional league in 1989.

A second promotion to the national competitions was achieved in 1992, and the club took a place in 1992–93 Division 4. At the end of the season the FFF reorganised the league, and the club were placed at level five, in National 3. After one season in this competition, they were again relegated back to the regional leagues.

The club did not gain a third promotion until 2009, when they took a place in 2009–10 Championnat de France amateur 2. They spent four seasons before returning to the regional league in 2013.

In 2016 the club gained a fourth promotion to the national leagues, taking a place in 2016–17 Championnat de France Amateur 2. For the first time they won promotion in a national division, and as of the 2017–18 season they play in Championnat National 2.

In July 2021, the club changed its name from Racing Club de Grasse to Racing Club Pays de Grasse, to illustrate its representation of the Pays de Grasse agglomeration of communities.

Current squad

Notable former players

 Paul Bahoken
 Stéphane Bahoken
 Julien Berthomier
 Laurent Charvet
 Laurent Leroy - fr.wiki 
 Yoann Touzghar
 Thomas Pinault

Honours
 Championnat de France Amateur 2 Group winner: 2017
 Division d'Honneur Mediterranean region champion: 1983, 1992, 2009, 2016

References

External links
  

Grasse
1959 establishments in France
Grasse
Sport in Alpes-Maritimes
Football clubs in Provence-Alpes-Côte d'Azur